The Rur Dam is a 77.2 metre high dam located in the southwestern part of the state of North Rhine-Westphalia in Germany. It was built in 1939 and impounds the River Rur to form the Rur Reservoir (Rurstausee or Rursee) which is 7.83 km2 in area. It lies within the districts of Aachen and Düren.

History
The original dam was built between 1934 and 1938 from earth and stone, with an inner lining of loam, coming into service in 1939. During the Second World War, on February 10, 1945, to impede the advance of the Anglo-Canadian 21st Army Group during Operation Veritable, water was released from the sluice gates; this delayed supportive action (Operation Grenade) by the American Ninth Army for two weeks. Construction from 1955 to 1959 raised the height of the dam by 20 meters to its present height of 77 meters above the riverbed.

Headwaters and tailwaters 
The headwaters of the Rur Reservoir, with their length in kilometres (km), according to the Deutsche Grundkarte map (sorted alphabetically):

 Allersbach (2.9 km); from Buhlert Ridge flowing from the west-northwest, empties into the central section of the reservoir
 Büdenbach (1.1 km); from the Kermeter flowing from the south, discharges near the dam wall in the northeastern part of the reservoir
 Eschbach (1 km); from the Kermeter flowing from the south, empties into the northeastern part of the reservoir
 Hohenbach (2.1 km); from the Kermeter flowing from the south, empties into the northeastern part of the reservoir
 Lederbach (1.1 km); from the Buhlert Ridge near the hamlet of Klaus flowing from the northwest, discharges into the central part of the reservoir
 Morsbach (1.2 km); from Schmidt-Eschauel flowing from the north, discharges into the central part of the reservoir
 Rur (164.5 km), the main headwater, flowing from the south and emptying into the southern end of the reservoir; forms the only natural tailwater
 Welchenbach (3.5 km); from the Monschauer Heckenland/from the direction of Simmerath in the west, discharges into the southern part of the reservoir
 Wolfsbach (2.2 km); from the Monschauer Heckenland/from Steckenborn (Simmerath) flowing from the west, discharges into the southern part of the reservoir
 Schilsbach, from Hechelscheidt/ Klaus, empties near Woffelsbach/ Schilsbachtal
 Weidenbach, empties near Rurberg/ Weidenbachtal

Panorama

See also 
 List of dams in Germany
 List of reservoirs by volume

References

Literature 
 Talsperren in der Bundesrepublik Deutschland, Peter Franke, Wolfgang Frey: DNK - DVWK 1987,

External links 

 NRW dam information
 Available measurement stations and time series for the Rur Dam at wver.de
 Webcam with view from Buoy 2 towards Buoy 1
 Water gauge and weather data
 RWTH weather station with webcam of the Woffelsbach Bay

Dams completed in 1939
Rhineland
RRurtalsperre
Dams in North Rhine-Westphalia

ceb:Rurtalsperre
de:Rurtalsperre